The Northwest Library is a branch of the Multnomah County Library, in Portland in the U.S. state of Oregon. The branch, which opened in 2001, offers the Multnomah County Library catalog of two million books, periodicals and other materials.

History
The branch opened on October 30, 2001,  and was the first new branch in the Multnomah County system since 1972. At , the library is designed to accommodate 20,000 volumes. Located in Portland's most densely populated community, it was highly anticipated by neighbors. The building used to be home to the Harris Wine Cellar.

The new library was funded by a $113 million levy passed in 1998, which funded reconstruction or renovation of 12 of the system's 15 branches. In May 2000, Multnomah County officials were considering one location between N.W. 22nd and 23rd avenues and N.W. Lovejoy Street, and another on N.W. 23rd Avenue and Thurman Street. Then-county commissioner Diane Linn worked with county officials to find the location. Including affordable housing in the mixed use design of the building was an important consideration. The Thurman Street location was ultimately selected. Another $77,000 was provided to the branch by the Library Foundation in November 2001, with the majority of that added to a permanent fund for the branch.

Architects for the renovation of the existing building were Holst Architecture for the exterior and Thomas Hacker and Associates for the interior. Northwest General Contractors was the contractor. Structural changes during the renovation included seismic upgrades and improved access for patrons with disabilities. Interior redesign added a meeting room, and the library was made Internet-ready.

References

External links
 

2001 establishments in Oregon
Libraries in Portland, Oregon
Multnomah County Library
Libraries established in 2001
Northwest District, Portland, Oregon